Suetonia Cressida Palmer is a New Zealand nephrology academic, and as of 2019 is a full professor at the University of Otago.

Academic career

After a 2009 PhD titled 'Kidney function in cardiovascular disease' at the University of Otago, Palmer rose to full professor.

Selected works 
 Palmer, Suetonia C., Sankar D. Navaneethan, Jonathan C. Craig, David W. Johnson, Marcello Tonelli, Amit X. Garg, Fabio Pellegrini et al. "Meta-analysis: erythropoiesis-stimulating agents in patients with chronic kidney disease." Annals of internal medicine 153, no. 1 (2010): 23–33.
 Palmer, Suetonia C., Sankar D. Navaneethan, Jonathan C. Craig, David W. Johnson, Marcello Tonelli, Amit X. Garg, Fabio Pellegrini et al. "Meta-analysis: erythropoiesis-stimulating agents in patients with chronic kidney disease." Annals of internal medicine 153, no. 1 (2010): 23–33.
 Ravani, Pietro, Suetonia C. Palmer, Matthew J. Oliver, Robert R. Quinn, Jennifer M. MacRae, Davina J. Tai, Neesh I. Pannu et al. "Associations between hemodialysis access type and clinical outcomes: a systematic review." Journal of the American Society of Nephrology 24, no. 3 (2013): 465–473.
 Palmer, Suetonia, Mariacristina Vecchio, Jonathan C. Craig, Marcello Tonelli, David W. Johnson, Antonio Nicolucci, Fabio Pellegrini et al. "Prevalence of depression in chronic kidney disease: systematic review and meta-analysis of observational studies." Kidney international 84, no. 1 (2013): 179–191.
 Palmer, Suetonia C., Jonathan C. Craig, Sankar D. Navaneethan, Marcello Tonelli, Fabio Pellegrini, and Giovanni FM Strippoli. "Benefits and harms of statin therapy for persons with chronic kidney disease: a systematic review and meta-analysis." Annals of internal medicine 157, no. 4 (2012): 263.

References

External links
 

Living people
New Zealand medical researchers
New Zealand women academics
Year of birth missing (living people)
Academic staff of the University of Otago
Nephrologists